This is a list of electricity-generating power stations in the U.S. state of Alaska, sorted by type and name.   In 2019, Alaska had a total summer capacity of 2,760 MW through all of its power plants, and a net generation of 5,944 GWh.  The corresponding electrical energy generation mix was 41% natural gas, 27.6% hydroelectric, 14.9% petroleum, 13.6% coal, 2.1% wind, 0.6% biomass and 0.2 solar.  The nation's only coal plant constructed since 2015 began operations in February 2020 at the University of Fairbanks.

A grid known as "the Railbelt" serves about two-thirds of the state's population; extending from Fairbanks through Anchorage and into the Kenai Peninsula. Many of Alaska's power stations are diesel generators which service isolated communities and their localized transmission & distribution networks. Alaska is second behind Hawaii in the consumption of petroleum for electricity generation. The Alaska Village Electric Cooperative serves 58 communities in rural Alaska. Many rural residential customers receive the Power Cost Equalization subsidy to bring high electric costs closer to what urban residents pay. The state has vast untapped renewable resources, including wind near its coastlines, hydropower in its high-precipitation mountain regions, biomass from its forest and agriculture products, and solar from its rooftops.

Nuclear power stations
There were no utility-scale nuclear facilities in the state of Alaska in 2022.  A proposed nuclear power station was the Galena Nuclear Power Plant.

Fossil-fuel power stations
Data reported by U.S. Energy Information Administration

Coal (Lignite)

 Multi-fuel plant, listed is "Total Net Summer Capacity" by source.

Petroleum

Natural gas

Renewable power stations
Data reported by U.S. Energy Information Administration

Biomass

Geothermal

Hydroelectric

  The "Battle Creek Project" increased the Bradley Lake hydro facility's production by about 10 percent.

Solar

Wind

Storage power stations
Data reported by U.S. Energy Information Administration

Battery

Flywheel

See also
 List of power stations in the United States

References

Lists of buildings and structures in Alaska
Energy in Alaska
 
Alaska